Ancient Secrets is a series on the National Geographic Channel. As the show unfolds, it attempts to investigate the world's most enduring – and infamous – structures, legends, and icons.

Episodes
The episodes are aired in different order in different territories.
 Mystery of The Silver Pharaoh
 The Sphinx
 China's Lost Pyramids
 Cathedrals Decoded
 Witch Hunter's Bible
 Secrets of The Parthenon
 The Lost Ship Of Rome
 China's Ghost Army

See also
Ancient X-Files

References

External links
 Official site

National Geographic (American TV channel)
American documentary television series
Paranormal television